The Wayne United States Post Office on Pearl Street in Wayne in Wayne County, Nebraska was built during 1934–35.  It was listed on the National Register of Historic Places in 2007.

According to its NRHP nomination, the post office was important as "Many jobs were created in a community that sorely needed them, and a lovely facility was constructed that has contributed to the livability of Wayne as a charming mid-sized community...."

References

External links

Post office buildings on the National Register of Historic Places in Nebraska
Art Deco architecture in Nebraska
Government buildings completed in 1934
National Register of Historic Places in Wayne County, Nebraska
1934 establishments in Nebraska